This article lists described species of the family Asilidae start with letter C.

A
B
C
D
E
F
G
H
I
J
K
L
M
N
O
P
Q
R
S
T
U
V
W
Y
Z

List of Species

Cabasa 
 Cabasa glabrata (Walker, 1861)
 Cabasa honesta (Walker, 1858)

Callinicus 
 Callinicus pictitarsis (Bigot, 1878)
 Callinicus pollenius (Cole, 1919)
 Callinicus vittatus (Wilcox, 1936)

Carebaricus 
 Carebaricus rionegrensis (Lamas, 1971)

Carinefferia 
 Carinefferia caliente (Wilcox, 1966)
 Carinefferia carinata (Bellardi, 1861)
 Carinefferia concinnata (Williston, 1901)
 Carinefferia cressoni (Hine, 1919)
 Carinefferia jubata (Williston, 1885)
 Carinefferia latruncula (Williston, 1885)
 Carinefferia ordwayae (Wilcox, 1966)
 Carinefferia parvula (Bellardi, 1861)
 Carinefferia prolificus (Osten-Sacken, 1887)
 Carinefferia subcuprea (Schaeffer, 1916)
 Carinefferia willistoni (Hine, 1919)

Carreraomyia 
 Carreraomyia acapulquensis (Cole & Pritchard, 1964)
 Carreraomyia alpuyeca (Cole & Pritchard, 1964)

Cenochromyia 
 Cenochromyia guttata (Hermann, 1912)
 Cenochromyia puer (Doleschall, 1858)
 Cenochromyia tripars (Walker, 1861)
 Cenochromyia xanthogaster (Hermann, 1912)

Ceraturgus 
 Ceraturgus aurulentus (Fabricius, 1805)
 Ceraturgus cruciatus (Say, 1823)
 Ceraturgus elizabethae (Brimley, 1924)
 Ceraturgus fasciatus (Walker, 1849)
 Ceraturgus hedini (Engel, 1934)
 Ceraturgus kawamurae (Matsumura, 1916)
 Ceraturgus mitchelli (Brimley, 1924)
 Ceraturgus niger (Macquart, 1838)
 Ceraturgus similis (Johnson, 1912)

Cerdistus 
 Cerdistus acuminatus (Theodor, 1980)
 Cerdistus antilco (Walker, 1849)
 Cerdistus australasiae (Schiner, 1868)
 Cerdistus australis (Macquart, 1847)
 Cerdistus australis (Lehr, 1967)
 Cerdistus begauxi (Tomasovic, 2005)
 Cerdistus blascozumetai (Weinberg & Bächli, 1975)
 Cerdistus claripes (White, 1918)
 Cerdistus coedicus (Walker, 1849)
 Cerdistus creticus (Hüttinger & Hradský, 1983)
 Cerdistus cygnis (Dakin & Fordham, 1922)
 Cerdistus dactylopygus (Janssens, 1968)
 Cerdistus debilis (Becker, 1923)
 Cerdistus desertorum (Efflatoun, 1934)
 Cerdistus elegans (Bigot, 1888)
 Cerdistus elicitus (Walker, 1851)
 Cerdistus erythruroides (Theodor, 1980)
 Cerdistus exilis (Macquart, 1838)
 Cerdistus flavicinctus (White, 1914)
 Cerdistus graminis (White, 1914)
 Cerdistus hermonensis (Theodor, 1980)
 Cerdistus indifferens (Becker, 1923)
 Cerdistus jubatus (Becker, 1923)
 Cerdistus laetus (Becker, 1925)
 Cerdistus lativentris (Pandellé, 1905)
 Cerdistus lautus (White, 1918)
 Cerdistus lekesi (Moucha & Hradský, 1963)
 Cerdistus lividus (White, 1918)
 Cerdistus manii (Schiner, 1867)
 Cerdistus maricus (Walker, 1851)
 Cerdistus melanomerus (Tsacas, 1964)
 Cerdistus mellis (Macquart, 1838)
 Cerdistus novus (Lehr, 1995)
 Cerdistus olympianus (Janssens, 1959)
 Cerdistus pallidus (Efflatoun, 1927)
 Cerdistus prostratus (Hardy, 1935)
 Cerdistus rectangularis (Theodor, 1980)
 Cerdistus rufometatarsus (Macquart, 1855)
 Cerdistus rusticanoides (Hardy, 1926)
 Cerdistus rusticanus (White, 1918)
 Cerdistus santoriensis (Hüttinger & Hradský, 1983)
 Cerdistus separatus (Hardy, 1935)
 Cerdistus setifemoratus (Macquart, 1855)
 Cerdistus setosus (Hardy, 1920)
 Cerdistus sugonjaevi (Lehr, 1967)
 Cerdistus villicatus (Walker, 1851)

Cerotainia 
 Cerotainia albibarbis (Curran, 1930)
 Cerotainia albipilosa (Curran, 1930)
 Cerotainia argyropasta (Hermann, 1921)
 Cerotainia argyropus (Schiner, 1868)
 Cerotainia argyropyga (Hermann, 1912)
 Cerotainia atrata (Jones, 1907)
 Cerotainia aurata (Schiner, 1868)
 Cerotainia bella (Schiner, 1867)
 Cerotainia bolivarii (Kaletta, 1986)
 Cerotainia brasiliensis (Schiner, 1867)
 Cerotainia camposi (Curran, 1934)
 Cerotainia clavijoi (Kaletta, 1986)
 Cerotainia dasythrix (Hermann, 1912)
 Cerotainia debilis (Hermann, 1912)
 Cerotainia dubia (Bigot, 1878)
 Cerotainia feminea (Curran, 1930)
 Cerotainia flavipes (Hermann, 1912)
 Cerotainia gerulewiczii (Kaletta, 1986)
 Cerotainia jolyi (Kaletta, 1986)
 Cerotainia leonina (Hermann, 1912)
 Cerotainia longimana (Hermann, 1912)
 Cerotainia lynchii (Williston, 1889)
 Cerotainia macrocera (Say, 1823)
 Cerotainia marginata (Hermann, 1912)
 Cerotainia melanosoma (Scarbrough & Knutson, 1989)
 Cerotainia minima (Curran, 1930)
 Cerotainia nigripennis (Bellardi, 1861)
 Cerotainia ornatipes (James, 1953)
 Cerotainia propinqua (Schiner, 1868)
 Cerotainia rhopalocera (Lynch & Arribálzaga, 1882)
 Cerotainia sarae (Rueda, 1998)
 Cerotainia sola (Scarbrough & Perez-Gelabert, 2006)
 Cerotainia unicolor (Hermann, 1912)
 Cerotainia violaceithorax (Lynch & Arribálzaga, 1880)
 Cerotainia willistoni (Curran, 1930)
 Cerotainia xanthoptera (Wiedemann, 1828)

Cerotainiops 
 Cerotainiops kernae (Martin, 1959)
 Cerotainiops mcclayi (Martin, 1959)
 Cerotainiops omus (Pritchard, 1942)

Cerozodus 
 Cerozodus nodicornis (Wiedemann, 1828)

Chilesus 
 Chilesus geminatus (Bromley, 1932)

Choerades 

 Choerades amurensis (Hermann, 1914)
 Choerades antipai (Weinberg & Pârvu, 1999)
 Choerades asprospilos (Young & Hradský, 2007)
 Choerades bella (Loew, 1858)
 Choerades castellanii (Hradský, 1962)
 Choerades caucasica (Richter & Mamaev, 1971)
 Choerades comptissima (Walker, 1857)
 Choerades conopoides (Oldroyd, 1972)
 Choerades dioctriaeformis (Meigen, 1820)
 Choerades fimbriata (Meigen, 1820)
 Choerades fortunata (Baez & Weinberg, 1981)
 Choerades hamardabanica (Lehr, 1991)
 Choerades ignea (Meigen, 1820)
 Choerades isshikii (Matsumura, 1916)
 Choerades kwadjoi (Tomasovic, 2007)
 Choerades lapponica (Zetterstedt, [183)
 Choerades montana (Lehr, 1977)
 Choerades mouchai (Hradský, 1985)
 Choerades multipunctata (Oldroyd, 1974)
 Choerades nigrescens (Ricardo, 1925)
 Choerades nigrovittata (Matsumura, 1916)
 Choerades nikolaevi (Lehr, 1977)
 Choerades perrara (Lehr, 1991)
 Choerades potanini (Lehr, 1991)
 Choerades rufipes (Fallén, 1814)
 Choerades scelesta (Richter, 1974)
 Choerades steinbergi (Richter, 1964)
 Choerades taiga (Lehr, 1991)
 Choerades unifascia (Walker, 1857)
 Choerades ursula (Loew, 1851)
 Choerades venatrix (Loew, 1847)
 Choerades xanthothrix (Hermann, 1914)
 Choerades yaeyamana (Haupt & Azuma, 1998)

Chryseutria 
 Chryseutria amphibola (Clements, 1985)
 Chryseutria nigrina (Hardy, 1928)

Chrysopogon 
 Chrysopogon agilis (Clements, 1985)
 Chrysopogon albosetosus (Clements, 1985)
 Chrysopogon aureus (Clements, 1985)
 Chrysopogon bellus (Clements, 1985)
 Chrysopogon bicolor (Clements, 1985)
 Chrysopogon brunnipes (Clements, 1985)
 Chrysopogon castaneus (Clements, 1985)
 Chrysopogon catachrysus (Clements, 1985)
 Chrysopogon conopsoides (Fabricius, 1775)
 Chrysopogon crabroniformis (von Roeder, 1881)
 Chrysopogon daptes (Clements, 1985)
 Chrysopogon dialeucus (Clements, 1985)
 Chrysopogon diaphanes (Clements, 1985)
 Chrysopogon fasciatus (Ricardo, 1912)
 Chrysopogon fuscus (Clements, 1985)
 Chrysopogon gammonensis (Lavigne, 2006)
 Chrysopogon harpaleus (Clements, 1985)
 Chrysopogon horni (Hardy, 1934)
 Chrysopogon leucodema (Clements, 1985)
 Chrysopogon melanorrhinus (Clements, 1985)
 Chrysopogon melas (Clements, 1985)
 Chrysopogon micrus (Clements, 1985)
 Chrysopogon muelleri (von Roeder, 1892)
 Chrysopogon pallidipennis (White, 1918)
 Chrysopogon papuensis (Clements, 1985)
 Chrysopogon paramonovi (Clements, 1985)
 Chrysopogon parvus (Clements, 1985)
 Chrysopogon pellos (Clements, 1985)
 Chrysopogon pilosifacies (Clements, 1985)
 Chrysopogon proximus (Clements, 1985)
 Chrysopogon rutilus (Clements, 1985)
 Chrysopogon sphecodes (Clements, 1985)
 Chrysopogon trianguliferus (Clements, 1985)
 Chrysopogon whitei (Hull, 1958)
 Chrysopogon xanthus (Clements, 1985)

Chrysotriclis 
 Chrysotriclis willinkorum (Artigas & Papavero, 1997)

Chylophaga 
 Chylophaga australis (Ricardo, 1912)

Chymedax 
 Chymedax delicatulus (Hull, 1958)

Clariola 
 Clariola cyaneithorax (Meijere, 1913)
 Clariola luteiventris (Meijere, 1913)
 Clariola pipunculoides (Walker, 1865)
 Clariola pulchra (Kertész, 1901)
 Clariola unicolor (Meijere, 1913)

Clephydroneura 
 Clephydroneura alveolusa (Shi, 1995)
 Clephydroneura anamalaiensis (Joseph & Parui, 1997)
 Clephydroneura apicalis (Oldroyd, 1938)
 Clephydroneura apicihirta (Shi, 1995)
 Clephydroneura bangalorensis (Joseph & Parui, 1997)
 Clephydroneura bannerghattaensis (Joseph & Parui, 1997)
 Clephydroneura bengalensis (Macquart, 1838)
 Clephydroneura bidensa (Shi, 1995)
 Clephydroneura brevipennis (Oldroyd, 1938)
 Clephydroneura cilia (Shi, 1995)
 Clephydroneura cochinensis (Oldroyd, 1938)
 Clephydroneura cristata (Oldroyd, 1938)
 Clephydroneura cylindra (Shi, 1995)
 Clephydroneura dasi (Parui & Das, 1994)
 Clephydroneura distincta (Oldroyd, 1938)
 Clephydroneura duvaucelii (Macquart, 1838)
 Clephydroneura exilis (Oldroyd, 1938)
 Clephydroneura fulvihirta (Shi, 1995)
 Clephydroneura ghorpadei (Joseph & Parui, 1997)
 Clephydroneura ghoshi (Parui & Das, 1994)
 Clephydroneura gravelyi (Joseph & Parui, 1997)
 Clephydroneura gymnura (Oldroyd, 1938)
 Clephydroneura hainanensis (Jiang, 1988)
 Clephydroneura hamiforceps (Shi, 1995)
 Clephydroneura indiana (Joseph & Parui, 1997)
 Clephydroneura karikalensis (Parui & Das, 1994)
 Clephydroneura karnatakaensis (Joseph & Parui, 1997)
 Clephydroneura lali (Joseph & Parui, 1997)
 Clephydroneura martini (Joseph & Parui, 1997)
 Clephydroneura minor (Oldroyd, 1938)
 Clephydroneura mudigorensis (Joseph & Parui, 1997)
 Clephydroneura mysorensis (Joseph & Parui, 1997)
 Clephydroneura nelsoni (Joseph & Parui, 1997)
 Clephydroneura nigrata (Shi, 1995)
 Clephydroneura nilaparvata (Joseph & Parui, 1997)
 Clephydroneura oldroydi (Joseph & Parui, 1997)
 Clephydroneura promboonae (Tomosovic & Grootaert, 2003)
 Clephydroneura pulla (Oldroyd, 1938)
 Clephydroneura robusta (Joseph & Parui, 1997)
 Clephydroneura rossi (Joseph & Parui, 1995)
 Clephydroneura semirufa (Oldroyd, 1938)
 Clephydroneura singhi (Joseph & Parui, 1997)
 Clephydroneura sundaica (Jaennicke, 1867)
 Clephydroneura trifissura (Shi, 1995)
 Clephydroneura wilcoxi (Joseph & Parui, 1997)

Clinopogon 
 Clinopogon barrus (Walker, 1849)
 Clinopogon cinctellus (Bigot, 1879)
 Clinopogon odontoferus (Joseph & Parui, 1984)
 Clinopogon plumbeus (Fabricius, 1775)
 Clinopogon reginaldi (Séguy, 1955)
 Clinopogon scalaris (Bigot, 1879)

Cnodalomyia 
 Cnodalomyia catarinensis (Lamas & Mellinger, 2008)
 Cnodalomyia obtusa (Hull, 1962)

Cochleariocera 
 Cochleariocera neusae (Artigas & Papavero, 1997)

Codula 
 Codula conspecta (Clements, 1985)
 Codula limbipennis (Macquart, 1850)
 Codula occidentalis (Clements, 1985)
 Codula vespiformis (Thomson, 1869)

Coleomyia 
 Coleomyia alticola (James, 1941)
 Coleomyia crumborum (Martin, 1953)
 Coleomyia hinei (Wilcox & Martin, 1935)
 Coleomyia rainieri (Wilcox & Martin, 1935)
 Coleomyia rubida (Martin, 1953)
 Coleomyia sculleni (Wilcox & Martin, 1935)
 Coleomyia setigera (Cole, 1919)

Colepia 
 Colepia abludo (Daniels, 1983)
 Colepia chrysochaites (Daniels, 1987)
 Colepia comatacauda (Daniels, 1987)
 Colepia compernis (Daniels, 1987)
 Colepia cultripes (Daniels, 1987)
 Colepia flavifacies (Daniels, 1987)
 Colepia horrida (Daniels, 1987)
 Colepia ignicolor (Daniels, 1987)
 Colepia lanata (Daniels, 1987)
 Colepia naevia (Daniels, 1987)
 Colepia novaeguineae (Daniels, 1987)

Comantella 
 Comantella cristata (Coquillett, 1893)
 Comantella fallei (Back, 1909)
 Comantella pacifica (Curran, 1926)
 Comantella rotgeri (James, 1937)

Congomochtherus 
 Congomochtherus acuminatus (Oldroyd, 1974)
 Congomochtherus elferinki (Londt & Tsacas, 1987)
 Congomochtherus inachus (Londt & Tsacas, 1987)
 Congomochtherus lobatus (Oldroyd, 1970)
 Congomochtherus oldoydi (Londt & Tsacas, 1987)
 Congomochtherus penicillatus (Speiser, 1910)
 Congomochtherus potamius (Londt & Tsacas, 1987)

Connomyia 
 Connomyia annae (Londt, 1993)
 Connomyia argyropodos (Londt, 1993)
 Connomyia argyropus (Engel, 1932)
 Connomyia barkeri (Bromley, 1947)
 Connomyia briani (Londt, 1993)
 Connomyia callima (Londt, 1993)
 Connomyia compressa (Karsch, 1886)
 Connomyia dravidica (Joseph & Parui, 1990)
 Connomyia ellioti (Londt, 1993)
 Connomyia indica (Joseph & Parui, 1990)
 Connomyia leonina (Engel, 1932)
 Connomyia mali (Londt, 1993)
 Connomyia midas (Londt, 1993)
 Connomyia oropegia (Londt, 1993)
 Connomyia pallida (Ricardo, 1925)
 Connomyia perata (Londt, 1993)
 Connomyia punctata (Engel, 1932)
 Connomyia tellinii (Bezzi, 1906)
 Connomyia tsacasi (Londt, 1993)
 Connomyia varipennis (Ricardo, 1925)
 Connomyia zeus (Londt, 1993)

Conosiphon 
 Conosiphon alter (Becker, 1923)
 Conosiphon pauper (Becker, 1907)
 Conosiphon similis (Becker, 1923)

Cophinopoda 
 Cophinopoda aldabraensis (Tsacas & Artigas, 1994)
 Cophinopoda andrewsi (Oldroyd, 1964)
 Cophinopoda barbonica (Tsacas & Artigas, 1994)
 Cophinopoda chinensis (Fabricius, 1794)
 Cophinopoda disputata (Tsacas & Artigas, 1994)
 Cophinopoda matilei (Tsacas & Artigas, 1994)
 Cophinopoda oldroydi (Tsacas & Artigas, 1994)
 Cophinopoda schumanni (Hradský & Hüttinger, 1982)

Cophura 
 Cophura acapulcae (Pritchard, 1943)
 Cophura albosetosa (Hine, 1908)
 Cophura ameles (Pritchard, 1943)
 Cophura apotma (Pritchard, 1943)
 Cophura atypha (Pritchard, 1943)
 Cophura bella (Loew, 1872)
 Cophura brevicornis (Williston, 1883)
 Cophura caca (Pritchard, 1943)
 Cophura calla (Pritchard, 1943)
 Cophura clausa (Coquillett, 1893)
 Cophura cora (Pritchard, 1943)
 Cophura dammersi (Wilcox, 1965)
 Cophura daphne (Pritchard, 1943)
 Cophura dora (Pritchard, 1943)
 Cophura feigei (Kaletta, 1983)
 Cophura ferugsoni (Wilcox, 1965)
 Cophura fisheri (Wilcox, 1965)
 Cophura fur (Williston, 1885)
 Cophura getzendaneri (Wilcox, 1959)
 Cophura hennei (Wilcox & Martin, 1945)
 Cophura hesperia (Pritchard, 1935)
 Cophura hurdi (Hull, 1960)
 Cophura igualae (Pritchard, 1943)
 Cophura nephressa (Pritchard, 1943)
 Cophura painteri (Pritchard, 1943)
 Cophura picta (Carrera, 1955)
 Cophura pollinosa (Curran, 1930)
 Cophura powersi (Wilcox, 1965)
 Cophura pulchella (Williston, 1901)
 Cophura rozeni (Wilcox, 1965)
 Cophura sculleni (Wilcox, 1937)
 Cophura sodalis (Osten-Sacken, 1887)
 Cophura stylosa (Curran, 1931)
 Cophura tanbarki (Wilcox, 1965)
 Cophura texana (Bromley, 1934)
 Cophura timberlakei (Wilcox, 1965)
 Cophura tolandi (Wilcox, 1959)
 Cophura vanduzeei (Wilcox, 1965)
 Cophura vandykei (Wilcox, 1965)
 Cophura vera (Pritchard, 1935)
 Cophura vitripennis (Curran, 1927)
 Cophura wilcoxi (Kaletta, 1983)
 Cophura zandra (Pritchard, 1943)

Cormansis 
 Cormansis halictides (Walker, 1851)

Corymyia 
 Corymyia antimelas (Londt, 1994)
 Corymyia euryops (Londt, 1994)
 Corymyia melas (Londt, 1994)
 Corymyia xantha (Londt, 1994)

Cratolestes 
 Cratolestes wirthi (Artigas, 1970)

Cratopoda 
 Cratopoda emarginata (Artigas, 1970)
 Cratopoda helix (Bromley, 1935)

Creolestes 
 Creolestes cinereum (Bigot, 1878)

Crobilocerus 
 Crobilocerus auriger (Musso, 1973)
 Crobilocerus engeli (Geller-Grimm & Hradský, 1999)
 Crobilocerus megilliformis (Loew, 1847)
 Crobilocerus spinosus (Theodor, 1980)

Cryptomerinx 
 Cryptomerinx laphriicornis (Enderlein, 1914)
 Cryptomerinx mirandai (Carrera, 1951)

Ctenodontina 
 Ctenodontina carrerai (Hull, 1958)
 Ctenodontina maya (Carrera & Andretta, 1953)
 Ctenodontina mochica (Lamas, 1973)
 Ctenodontina pectinatipes (Enderlein, 1914)

Ctenota 
 Ctenota armeniaca (Paramonov, 1930)
 Ctenota asiatica (Lehr, 1964)
 Ctenota brunnea (Theodor, 1980)
 Ctenota coerulea (Becker, 1913)
 Ctenota efflatouni (Engel, 1925)
 Ctenota halophila (Lehr, 1964)
 Ctenota molitrix (Loew, 1873)

Cylicomera 
 Cylicomera dissona (Lamas, 1973)

Cymbipyga 
 Cymbipyga cymbafera (Artigas, 1983)

Cyphomyiactia 
 Cyphomyiactia costai (Artigas & Papavero, 1991)

Cyrtophrys 
 Cyrtophrys albimanus (Carrera, 1949)

Cyrtopogon 

 Cyrtopogon ablautoides (Melander, 1923)
 Cyrtopogon albibarbatus (Lehr, 1998)
 Cyrtopogon albifacies (Johnson, 1942)
 Cyrtopogon albifrons (Wilcox & Martin, 1936)
 Cyrtopogon albovarians (Curran, 1924)
 Cyrtopogon aldrichi (Wilcox & Martin, 1936)
 Cyrtopogon alleni (Back, 1909)
 Cyrtopogon annulatus (Hermann, 1906)
 Cyrtopogon anomalus (Cole, 1919)
 Cyrtopogon aurifex (Osten-Sacken, 1877)
 Cyrtopogon auripilosus (Wilcox & Martin, 1936)
 Cyrtopogon banksi (Wilcox & Martin, 1936)
 Cyrtopogon basingeri (Wilcox & Martin, 1936)
 Cyrtopogon beameri (Wilcox & Martin, 1936)
 Cyrtopogon bigelowi (Curran, 1924)
 Cyrtopogon caesius (Melander, 1923)
 Cyrtopogon callipedilus (Loew, 1874)
 Cyrtopogon centralis (Loew, 1871)
 Cyrtopogon chagnoni (Curran, 1939)
 Cyrtopogon curtipennis (Wilcox & Martin, 1936)
 Cyrtopogon curtistylus (Curran, 1923)
 Cyrtopogon cymbalista (Osten-Sacken, 1877)
 Cyrtopogon dasyllis (Williston, 1893)
 Cyrtopogon dasylloides (Williston, 1883)
 Cyrtopogon distinctitarsus (Adisoemarto, 1967)
 Cyrtopogon evidens (Osten-Sacken, 1877)
 Cyrtopogon fumipennis (Wilcox & Martin, 1936)
 Cyrtopogon glarealis (Melander, 1923)
 Cyrtopogon gobiensis (Lehr, 1998)
 Cyrtopogon gorodkovi (Lehr, 1966)
 Cyrtopogon grunini (Lehr, 1998)
 Cyrtopogon idahoensis (Wilcox & Martin, 1936)
 Cyrtopogon infuscatus (Cole, 1919)
 Cyrtopogon inversus (Curran, 1923)
 Cyrtopogon jakutensis (Lehr, 1998)
 Cyrtopogon khasiensis (Bromley, 1935)
 Cyrtopogon kirilli (Lehr, 1977)
 Cyrtopogon kovalevi (Lehr, 1998)
 Cyrtopogon kozlovi (Lehr, 1998)
 Cyrtopogon kushka (Lehr, 1998)
 Cyrtopogon laphrides (Walker, 1851)
 Cyrtopogon laphriformis (Curran, 1923)
 Cyrtopogon laxenecera (Bromley, 1935)
 Cyrtopogon leleji (Lehr, 1998)
 Cyrtopogon leptotarsus (Curran, 1923)
 Cyrtopogon leucozona (Loew, 1874)
 Cyrtopogon longimanus (Loew, 1874)
 Cyrtopogon lutatius (Walker, 1849)
 Cyrtopogon lyratus (Osten-Sacken, 1878)
 Cyrtopogon jemezi (Wilcox & Martin, 1936)
 Cyrtopogon malistus (Richter, 1974)
 Cyrtopogon marginalis (Loew, 1866)
 Cyrtopogon michnoi (Lehr, 1998)
 Cyrtopogon nitidus (Cole, 1924)
 Cyrtopogon nugator (Osten-Sacken, 1877)
 Cyrtopogon oasis (Lehr, 1998)
 Cyrtopogon ornatus (Oldroyd, 1964)
 Cyrtopogon pamirensis (Lehr, 1998)
 Cyrtopogon pedemontanus (Bezzi, 1927)
 Cyrtopogon perrisi (Séguy, 1927)
 Cyrtopogon perspicax (Cole, 1919)
 Cyrtopogon pictipennis (Coquillett, 1899)
 Cyrtopogon planitarsus (Wilcox & Martin, 1936)
 Cyrtopogon platycaudus (Curran, 1924)
 Cyrtopogon plausor (Osten-Sacken, 1877)
 Cyrtopogon popovi (Lehr, 1966)
 Cyrtopogon praepes (Williston, 1883)
 Cyrtopogon profusus (Osten-Sacken, 1877)
 Cyrtopogon pulcher (Back, 1909)
 Cyrtopogon pulchripes (Loew, 1871)
 Cyrtopogon rainieri (Wilcox & Martin, 1936)
 Cyrtopogon rattus (Osten-Sacken, 1877)
 Cyrtopogon robustisetus (Lehr, 1998)
 Cyrtopogon ruficornis (Fabricius, 1794)
 Cyrtopogon rufitibialis (Bigot, 1878)
 Cyrtopogon rufotarsus (Back, 1909)
 Cyrtopogon sabroskyi (Lavigne, 1981)
 Cyrtopogon sansoni (Curran, 1923)
 Cyrtopogon saxicola (Lehr, 1998)
 Cyrtopogon semitarius (Melander, 1923)
 Cyrtopogon skopini (Lehr, 1998)
 Cyrtopogon stenofrons (Wilcox & Martin, 1936)
 Cyrtopogon sudator (Osten-Sacken, 1877)
 Cyrtopogon svaneticus (Lehr, 1998)
 Cyrtopogon swezeyi (Wilcox & Martin, 1936)
 Cyrtopogon tarbagataicus (Lehr, 1998)
 Cyrtopogon tenuibarbus (Loew, 1856)
 Cyrtopogon tenuis (Bromley, 1924)
 Cyrtopogon thompsoni (Cole, 1919)
 Cyrtopogon tibialis (Coquillett, 1904)
 Cyrtopogon transiliensis (Lehr, 1998)
 Cyrtopogon turgenicus (Lehr, 1998)
 Cyrtopogon vanduzeei (Wilcox & Martin, 1936)
 Cyrtopogon vandykei (Wilcox & Martin, 1936)
 Cyrtopogon varans (Curran, 1923)
 Cyrtopogon villosus (Lehr, 1998)
 Cyrtopogon vulneratus (Melander, 1923)
 Cyrtopogon willistoni (Curran, 1923)

Cystoprosopa 
 Cystoprosopa semirufa (Wiedemann, 1828)

References 

 
Asilidae
Articles containing video clips